Gitit (or darcsit) is a form of wiki software employing a distributed revision control system such as Git to manage the wiki history, and the Pandoc document conversion system to manage markup – permitting, among other things, the inclusion of LaTeX mathematical markup.

Features
 Revision Control using Git, Darcs (also called darcsit in such cases) or Mercurial backends.
 Pandoc for markup, so pages may be written in (extended) markdown, reStructuredText, LaTeX, HTML, or literate Haskell, and exported in ten different formats, including LaTeX, ConTeXt, DocBook, RTF, OpenOffice.org ODT, and MediaWiki markup.
 Unicode support.
 Support for Math using MathML or MathJax.
 Syntax highlighting for code snippets.
 Slide shows for wiki pages.
 Plugin support.

See also

 ikiwiki: Also uses a version control system to store pages
 Gollum Wiki: Git-based wiki software with similar features

References

External links
 

Free wiki software
Free software programmed in Haskell
Software using distributed version control
Distributed bug tracking systems